The Pakistan Human Development Fund (PHDF) is located in Islamabad, Pakistan.

References

External links
 Pakistan Human Development Fund
 PHDF UK
 Home

Pakistan federal departments and agencies